The 1984 NCAA Division I men's basketball tournament involved 53 schools playing in single-elimination play to determine the national champion of men's NCAA Division I college basketball. It began on March 13, 1984, and ended with the championship game on April 2 in Seattle. A total of 52 games were played. This was the last tournament in which some teams earned first-round byes as the field expanded to 64 teams beginning in the 1985 tournament when each team played in the first round. It was also the second year with a preliminary round; preliminary games would not be played again until 2001.

Georgetown, coached by John Thompson, won the national title with an 84–75 victory in the final game over Houston, coached by Guy Lewis. Patrick Ewing of Georgetown was named the tournament's Most Outstanding Player. Thompson became the first African-American head coach to lead his team to any NCAA Division I title.

Georgetown reached the Final Four for the third time in school history and second time in three years to face Kentucky, a team which had never lost a national semifinal game and was led by the "Twin Towers", Sam Bowie and Melvin Turpin. Bowie and Turpin managed to get Ewing into foul trouble early, and with him on the bench and Reggie Williams shooting only 1-for-7 (14.3%) from the field during the game, the Wildcats raced out to a 27–15 lead with 3:06 left in the first half. After that, however, the Hoyas made a defensive stand still unequalled in college basketball: Kentucky scored only two more points in the first half; the Wildcats also did not score in the first 9 minutes 55 seconds of the second half, missing their first 12 shots and after that shooting 3-for-21 (14.3%) during the remainder of the game. Overall, Kentucky shot 3-for-33 (9.1 percent) from the field during the second half. Although he played for only 17 minutes and suffered a season-ending foot injury in the second half, Gene Smith had one of the best defensive games of his career. Bowie and Turpin finished the game a combined 5-for-21, Wingate scored 12 points and held Kentucky's Jim Master to 2-for-7 (28.6%) shooting from the field, Michael Jackson scored 12 points and pulled down a career-high 10 rebounds, and Georgetown won 53–40 to advance to the national final for the third time in school history and second time in three years.

In the first national semifinal, Houston, playing in its third consecutive Final Four, edged Virginia, which reached the Final Four as a No. 7 seed in the East region, 49–47. The Cavaliers reached the national semifinals despite the graduation of four-time All-American Ralph Sampson the previous season. Coincidentally, Houston's All-America center, Akeem Olajuwon, would soon become Sampson's teammate with the Houston Rockets.

In the NCAA final, Georgetown faced Houston on April 2. Reggie Williams demonstrated his true potential for the first time, putting in a strong defensive performance and shooting 9-for-18 (50.0%) from the field with 19 points and seven rebounds in the game, while David Wingate scored 16 points and Ewing managed 10 points and nine rebounds. Jackson scored 11 points and had six assists, two of which set up Ewing and Michael Graham for decisive baskets late in the game. The game was decided well before the final whistle, and the Hoyas won the school's first national championship 84–75. Late in the game, with Georgetown enjoying a comfortable lead, Thompson began to pull starters out and give bench players some time on the court; the game's enduring image came when senior guard Fred Brown came out of the game. Two years earlier, Brown had mistakenly passed the ball to North Carolina's James Worthy in the last seconds of the 1982 championship game, ruining Georgetown's chances for a final game-winning shot and allowing North Carolina to take the national championship, and cameras had captured Thompson consoling a devastated Brown with a hug as the Tar Heels celebrated. As Brown left the 1984 championship game, cameras caught Brown and Thompson again embracing on the sideline, this time to celebrate a victory.

Schedule and venues

The following are the sites that were selected to host each round of the 1984 tournament, and their host(s):

Opening Round
March 13
East/West Regions
 Palestra, Philadelphia, Pennsylvania (Penn/Temple)
Mideast/Midwest Regions
 University of Dayton Arena, Dayton, Ohio (Dayton)

First/Second Rounds
March 15 and 17
East Region
 Charlotte Coliseum, Charlotte, North Carolina (UNC Charlotte)
Mideast Region
 BJCC Coliseum, Birmingham, Alabama (Southeastern Conference)
Midwest Region
 Mid-South Coliseum, Memphis, Tennessee (Memphis State)
West Region
 Special Events Center, Salt Lake City, Utah (Utah)
March 16 and 18
East Region
 Brendan Byrne Arena, East Rutherford, New Jersey (Seton Hall)
Mideast Region
 MECCA Arena, Milwaukee, Wisconsin (UW-Milwaukee/Marquette)
Midwest Region
 Bob Devaney Sports Center, Lincoln, Nebraska (Nebraska)
West Region
 Beasley Coliseum, Pullman, Washington (Washington State)

Regional semifinals and finals (Sweet Sixteen/Elite Eight)
March 22 and 24
East Regional, Omni Coliseum, Atlanta, Georgia (Georgia Tech)
Mideast Regional, Rupp Arena, Lexington, Kentucky (Kentucky)
March 23 and 25
Midwest Regional, St. Louis Arena, St. Louis, Missouri (Missouri Valley Conference/St. Louis)
West Regional, Pauley Pavilion, Los Angeles, California (UCLA)

National semifinals and championship (Final Four and championship)
March 31 and April 2
Kingdome, Seattle, Washington (Seattle/Washington)

Seattle was the host city for the Final Four for the first time since 1952, and the first time in the Kingdome, then home to the NBA's Seattle SuperSonics, as well as the MLB's Mariners and NFL's Seahawks. The Kingdome became the third domed multipurpose stadium to host a Final Four, after the Astrodome and the Superdome. Three cities—East Rutherford, Memphis, and Milwaukee—hosted for the first time. East Rutherford, located between New York City and Newark, was the fourth site to host games in the New York metropolitan area. The Mid-South Coliseum and MECCA Arena hosted this time only, with future games in Memphis at The Pyramid and FedExForum and in Milwaukee at the now-defunct BMO Harris Bradley Center or Fiserv Forum. The games at the MECCA Arena were the first tournament games in Wisconsin since Madison hosted the Mideast regionals in 1969. This tournament marked the last time the Palestra, the "Cathedral of College Basketball", hosted an NCAA Tournament game; future games in Philadelphia were at the Spectrum or the Wells Fargo Center.

Teams

Bracket
* – Denotes overtime period

Preliminary round

East Regional – Atlanta, Georgia

Midwest Regional – St. Louis, Missouri

Mideast Regional – Lexington, Kentucky

West Regional – Los Angeles

Final Four

Championship game

Broadcast information

Television
CBS Sports
Brent Musburger served as Studio Host
Gary Bender and Billy Packer – First round (Dayton-LSU) at Salt Lake City, Utah; Second Round at Charlotte, North Carolina (North Carolina–Temple, Indiana–Richmond) and Lincoln, Nebraska (DePaul–Illinois State, Wake Forest–Kansas); East Regional semifinal (North Carolina–Indiana) and Regional Final at Atlanta, Georgia; West Regional Final at Los Angeles, California; Final Four at Seattle, Washington
Verne Lundquist and Steve Grote – Second Round at Memphis, Tennessee (Houston–Louisiana Tech, Memphis State–Purdue) and Milwaukee, Wisconsin (Tulsa–Louisville, Illinois–Villanova); Midwest Regional semifinal (DePaul–Wake Forest) and Regional Final at St. Louis, Missouri
Frank Glieber and Larry Conley – First (Miami of Ohio–SMU) and Second (Georgetown–SMU, Duke–Washington) Rounds at Pullman, Washington; Mideast Regional Final at Lexington, Kentucky
Dick Stockton and Bill Raftery – Second Round at East Rutherford, New Jersey (Arkansas–Virginia, Syracuse–VCU); West Regional semifinal (Georgetown–UNLV) at Los Angeles, California
Frank Herzog and James Brown – Second Round at Birmingham, Alabama (Kentucky–Brigham Young, Maryland–West Virginia)
Tim Ryan and Lynn Shackelford – Second Round at Salt Lake City, Utah (Oklahoma–Dayton, UTEP–UNLV)

ESPN/NCAA Productions
Bob Ley served at Studio host and Dick Vitale as Studio analyst
Jim Thacker and Irv Brown – East Regional semifinal (Syracuse–Virginia) at Atlanta, Georgia
Tom Hammond and Larry Conley – Preliminary Round at Dayton, Ohio; Mideast Regional semifinals at Lexington, Kentucky
Fred White and Gary Thompson – Midwest Regional semifinal (Houston–Memphis State) at St. Louis, Missouri
Mike Walden and Bill Raftery – West Regional semifinal (Washington–Dayton) at Los Angeles, California
Jim Thacker and Jeff Mullins – First round at Charlotte, North Carolina (Temple–St. John's, Auburn–Richmond)
Jim Thacker and Bill Raftery – First round at East Rutherford, New Jersey (VCU–Northeastern, Virginia–Iona)
Fred White and Irv Brown – First round at Birmingham, Alabama (Oregon State–West Virginia, Brigham Young–UAB)
Tom Hammond and Wayne Larrivee – First round at Milwaukee, Wisconsin (Louisville–Morehead State, Villanova–Marshall)
John Sanders and Joe Dean – First round at Memphis, Tennessee (Fresno State–Louisiana Tech, Memphis State–Oral Roberts)
Frank Fallon and Gary Thompson – First round at Lincoln, Nebraska (Illinois State–Alabama, Kansas–Alcorn State)
Mike Walden and Larry Conley – First round at Pullman, Washington (Washington–Nevada)
John Sanders and Bill Raftery – Preliminary Round at Philadelphia, Pennsylvania

Local radio

See also
 1984 NAIA men's basketball tournament
 1984 National Invitation Tournament
 1984 NCAA Division I women's basketball tournament
 1984 NCAA Division II men's basketball tournament
 1984 NCAA Division III men's basketball tournament
 NAIA Women's Basketball Championships
 National Women's Invitational Tournament
 NCAA Division II women's basketball tournament
 NCAA Division III women's basketball tournament

References

NCAA Division I men's basketball tournament
Ncaa
Basketball competitions in Seattle
NCAA Division I men's basketball tournament
NCAA Division I men's basketball tournament
NCAA Division I men's basketball tournament, 1984
NCAA Division I men's basketball tournament